Interstate 195 (I-195) is a  auxiliary Interstate Highway connecting I-95 (its parent route) in the west with Miami Beach in the east. It crosses Biscayne Bay by traveling over the Julia Tuttle Causeway. The causeway is named after Miami founder Julia Tuttle.

It is part of the longer State Road 112 (SR 112), which continues to the west as the Airport Expressway and to the east as Arthur Godfrey Road (41st Street).

As part of a pilot program, the Florida Department of Transportation painted the shoulders as bike lanes east of US Highway 1 (US 1). Pedestrians are still prohibited.

Route description

I-195 begins at the eastern end of the I-95 and SR 112 interchange (alternatively known as the 36th Street Interchange), heading east with interchanges with Miami Avenue and US 1 before heading onto the Julia Tuttle Causeway, where the Interstate crosses Biscayne Bay.

History
On December 23, 1961, three signed roads along the route of SR 112 were opened: the 36th Street Tollway (now the Airport Expressway), I-195, and I-195 Spur, along with a stretch of I-95 in Miami. I-195 Spur was the surface portion of the west–east state road along Arthur Godfrey Road in Miami Beach, connecting I-195 and SR A1A east of the causeway. The I-195 Spur signs disappeared from the road shortly after the designation was decommissioned by the newly formed US Department of Transportation in the late 1960s.

In popular culture
Famously, in early 1975, the rhythm of their car on this road was the inspiration for the Bee Gees's song "Jive Talkin'".

Exit list

See also

 Jive Talkin' (Bee Gees song - Origins)
 Julia Tuttle Causeway sex offender colony

References

External links

 
 FDOT GIS data
 Florida @ SouthEastRoads - Interstate 195 and Florida 112

95-1 (Florida)
95-1
Intracoastal Waterway
1 (Florida)
Expressways in Miami-Dade County, Florida
Expressways in Miami
1961 establishments in Florida